The Weston Flags Formation is a geological formation in Shropshire, England. It preserves fossils dating back to the Darriwilian stage of the Ordovician period.

See also

 List of fossiliferous stratigraphic units in England

References

 

Geologic formations of England
Ordovician System of Europe
Ordovician England